Bobs Creek is a stream in Crawford County in the U.S. state of Missouri. It is a tributary of the Meramec River.

Bobs Creek has the first name of a businessperson in the local coal industry.

See also
List of rivers of Missouri

References

Rivers of Crawford County, Missouri
Rivers of Missouri